Petro Ivanovych Shulyak (born 29 March 1945, in Korshiv, Zdolbuniv Raion, Ukrainian SSR) is a member of the Ukrainian military, Colonel General who served as the Chief of General Staff and Commander of the Ukrainian Ground Forces.

Native of Ukraine, on 30 January 1992 Shulyak was dismissed from his post of chief of cadres (personnel) administration of the Baltic Military District for expressing his interest in joining Ukrainian Armed Forces as the "alien army".

Following the incident, Minister of Defence of Ukraine Kostiantyn Morozov offered him position of commander of the 13th Army located in Carpathian Military District based in Rivne, native region of Shulyak. Soon thereafter Shulyak was placed in charge of Carpathian Military District. As a commander of the district he played important role in formation, training and deployment of the Ukrainian peacekeeping military formations to Yugoslavia and Angola.

Due to dissolution of the Soviet Union and financial crisis that followed, the district had difficult times to pay salary to military personnel and provide them with adequate housing, but was able to overcome it with help of local government. The Carpathian Military District became one of the first that joined the NATO program Partnership for Peace. As part of the program in 1995 near Yavoriv was conducted joined United States – Ukraine military exercise. Six years later Shulyak as a Commander of the Ukrainian Armed Forces turned the Yavoriv field training site into a special Partnership for Peace training center. As part of international cooperation, Shulyak also was involved to creation of the Polish–Ukrainian Peace Force Battalion, the idea for which appeared soon after the visit of Polish general Zenon Brik to Carpathian Military District.

Due to the 2002 Sknyliv air show disaster, Shulyak was dismissed from post of chief of the General Staff by President of Ukraine and Supreme commander-in-chief Leonid Kuchma.

In 2003 as a commander of the Ukrainian Ground Forces, Colonel General Petro Shulyak with a group of officers visited Iraq where as part of multi-national force a peacekeeping mission was carried out by the 5th Separate Mechanized Brigade. Based in Al Kut, the Ukrainian military carried its mission mostly at the Iraq–Iran state border.

References

External links 

1945 births
Living people
People from Rivne Oblast
Colonel Generals of Ukraine
Chiefs of the General Staff (Ukraine)
Frunze Military Academy alumni
Military Academy of the General Staff of the Armed Forces of the Soviet Union alumni
Recipients of the Order of Bohdan Khmelnytsky, 2nd class
Recipients of the Order of Bohdan Khmelnytsky, 3rd class